The 1955–56 Liga Alef season was the first in which Liga Alef was the second tier of Israeli football due to the formation of Liga Leumit, and was the first nationwide second tier season (replacing Liga Bet North and South regional divisions).

Hakoah Tel Aviv won the league and qualified for the promotion play-offs against Maccabi Jaffa (10th at the 1955–56 Liga Leumit).

League matches were completed on 2 June 1956, however, Hapoel Balfouria appealed against the results which were set in its matches against Hapoel Nahariya (a walkover loss of 0–3) and Hapoel Jerusalem (which was abandoned with a score of 4–0 to Hapoel Jerusalem), as Balfouria could be spared from relegation with two wins in these matches. The first replayed match was played on 28 July 1956, and as Hapoel Balfouria lost 2–4 to Hapoel Nahariya, Balfouria gave up its claims regarding the match against Hapoel Jerusalem, agreeing to set the score to 0–4 to Hapoel Jerusalem.

An 18th round match between Hapoel Nahariya and Beitar Jerusalem wasn't played due to misunderstanding between the teams regarding the time of the match, and was left unplayed at the end of the season.

Final table

Relegation playoff
Liga Alef winner, Hakoah Tel Aviv face Liga Leumit 10th-placed club, Maccabi Jaffa. The matches took place on June 10 and 17, 1956.

Maccabi Jaffa won 4–1 on aggregate and remained in Liga Leumit. Hakoah Tel Aviv remained in Liga Alef.

Relegation play-offs
A promotion-relegation play-off between the 9th and 10th placed teams in Liga Alef, Ahva Notzrit Haifa and Beitar Jerusalem, and the winners of the regional divisions of Liga Bet, Maccabi Sha'arayim and Maccabi Hadera. Each team played the other three once.

Notes
1. Abandoned at the 70th minute with the score of 2–1 to Maccabi Hadera as Ahva Notzrit Haifa players protested awarding Hadera's second goal, which they claimed was stopped by the goalkeeper before the goal line.

References
Beitar Jerusalem in top of the play-offs table Maariv, 26.8.56, Historical Jewish Press 
Beitar Jerusalem 4-2 Maccabi Hadera Heruth, 2.9.56, Historical Jewish Press 
Previous seasons The Israel Football Association 

Liga Alef seasons
Israel
2